JAR Pictures is an Indian motion picture production company based in Mumbai. The company was founded in 2011 by Bollywood producers Ajay G. Rai and Alan McAlex. Jar Pictures is mostly known for making independent films. Jar Pictures also provides production services to leading studios in India.

Jar Pictures' Liar's Dice was India's Official Entry for the Best Foreign Language Film for the 87th Academy Awards.

History
Jar Pictures was formerly known as Jar Entertainment, a company wholly owned by Ajay G. Rai. Ajay met Alan McAlex while working on the film Thank you (2011) where Ajay was the Executive Producer and Alan was the line producer. They decided to collaborate and Jar Pictures was formed.

Filmography
Films produced by Jar Pictures

Film Production Services by Jar Pictures

OTT

Awards
 62nd National Film Awards: Best Feature Film in Marathi: Killa

References

External links 
Official Website

Film production companies based in Mumbai
2011 establishments in Maharashtra
Indian companies established in 2011
Mass media companies established in 2011